Khanik castle is a historical castle located in Ferdows County in South Khorasan Province, The longevity of this fortress dates back to the Age of Insecurity and the Absence of Security Forces (Nizari Ismaili state).

References 

Castles in Iran
Castles of the Nizari Ismaili state